Krásné is a municipality and village in Chrudim District in the Pardubice Region of the Czech Republic. It has about 100 inhabitants.

Administrative parts
Villages of Chlum and Polánka are administrative parts of Krásné.

Sights
It was built in 1958–1960.

References

External links

Villages in Chrudim District